Ohio's 20th House of Representatives district is located in eastern Franklin County, Ohio, with the major population centers being Canal Winchester, Ohio, Groveport, Ohio, Obetz, Ohio, Reynoldsburg, Ohio and Whitehall, Ohio. District 20 has a diverse population and includes rural, suburban and urban cities, villages and townships. The district's boundaries were last redrawn in 2012 and the seat was previously held by Democrat Heather Bishoff who resigned on April 27, 2017. Richard Brown, an attorney from Canal Winchester was appointed for the remainder of her term.

Representative history

Election results

2020

References

Ohio House of Representatives districts
Franklin County, Ohio